Wem Town Football Club is a football club based in the market town of Wem, Shropshire, England.

History
The club was formed in 1883.

For the 1989–90 season, they joined the West Midlands (Regional) League Division Two, and in their first season in the division, won promotion to Division One. This is where they remained until 1995, when they left the league. In 2009–10, they rejoined the West Midlands (Regional) League, after winning the Shropshire County League. During this season, they finished Division Two runners-up and were awarded promotion back to Division One. They then spent nine seasons in Division One, before being crowned Division One champions at the end of the 2017–18 season.

Ahead of the 2020–21 season, the club were transferred to Division One South of the North West Counties League as the West Midlands (Regional) League lost its Premier Division as part of National League System's restructure. However, the club withdrew from the league, and were instead placed in the Premier Division of the Shropshire County League.

Honours
Shropshire County League
Champions 2008–09
West Midlands (Regional) League
Division One champions 2017–18

References

Football clubs in England
Football clubs in Shropshire
1883 establishments in England
Association football clubs established in 1883
Sport in Shropshire
Shropshire County Premier Football League
Wem
West Midlands (Regional) League